In mathematics, the Kubilius model relies on a clarification and extension of a finite probability space on which the behaviour of additive arithmetic functions can be modeled by sum of independent random variables.

The method was introduced in Jonas Kubilius's monograph Tikimybiniai metodai skaičių teorijoje (published in Lithuanian in 1959) / Probabilistic Methods in the Theory of Numbers (published in English in 1964) .

Eugenijus Manstavičius and Fritz Schweiger wrote about Kubilius's work in 1992, "the most impressive work has been done on the statistical theory of arithmetic functions which almost created a new research area called Probabilistic Number Theory. A monograph (Probabilistic Methods in the Theory of Numbers) devoted to this topic was translated into English in 1964 and became very influential."

References

Further reading
 
 

Number theory